The Kent Place School is a girls independent college-preparatory day school (with a coeducational nursery and pre-kindergarten) serving students in preschool through twelfth grade in Summit, Union County, New Jersey, United States.

Kent Place School is a member of the New Jersey Association of Independent Schools. In 2007, The Wall Street Journal listed Kent Place School as one of the world's top 50 schools for its success in preparing students to enter top American universities.

As of the 2017-18 school year, the school had an enrollment of 602 students (plus 19 in PreK) and 78.8 classroom teachers (on an FTE basis), for a student–teacher ratio of 7.6:1. The school's student body was 66.0% White, 18.4% Asian, 12.0% Black and 3.7% Hispanic.

Academics
The Primary, Middle, and Upper Schools each include science labs, art studios, and a computer lab. The Arts Center features a 260-seat theater, an art gallery, a dance studio, and practice rooms. Athletic facilities include a field house (gymnasium and weight room), three playing fields, and five tennis courts.

Advanced Placement Program (AP) courses offered at the school include AP Art History, AP Biology, AP Calculus AB, AP Calculus BC, AP Chemistry, AP Computer Science, AP English Language and Composition, AP English Literature and Composition, AP Environmental Science, AP European History, AP French Language, AP Latin Literature, AP Macroeconomics, AP Music Theory, AP Physics 1, AP Spanish Language, AP Spanish Literature, AP Statistics, AP Studio Art, AP United States History, AP United States Government and Politics, and AP World History. The school also offers additional advanced mathematics courses in multivariable calculus and linear algebra.

Athletics
The Kent Place School Dragons compete in the Union County Interscholastic Athletic Conference, which is comprised of public and private high schools in union County and operates under the supervision of the New Jersey State Interscholastic Athletic Association (NJSIAA). Before the 2010 realignment, the school had participated in the Mountain Valley Conference, which consisted of public and parochial high schools in Essex County and Union County. With 396 students in grades 10-12, the school was classified by the NJSIAA for the 2019–20 school year as Non-Public A for most athletic competition purposes, which included schools with an enrollment of 381 to 1,454 students in that grade range (equivalent to Group I for public schools).

The Upper School offers varsity level teams in cross country, soccer, tennis, field hockey, volleyball, basketball, swimming, squash, ice hockey, fencing, indoor track, lacrosse, softball, and outdoor track. Middle School teams are available in basketball, field hockey, lacrosse, soccer, softball, swimming, tennis, track and field, and volleyball. Physical Education classes are also offered in Middle and Upper School in place of a sport. Physical Education is required in the Primary School and grade six.

The field hockey team won the North II Group I state sectional championship in 1999.

The spring track team was the Non-Public Group B state champion in 2013.

The cross country team won the Non-Public Group B state championship in 2013.

The track team won the Non-Public Group B indoor track championship in 2014.

The girls tennis team won the Non-Public A state championship in 2017 and 2019, defeating Pingry School in the tournament final both years. The 2017 team finished the season 21-1, including a 3-2 victory against Pingry for the Non-Public A title.

Notable alumnae

 Saleemah Abdul-Ghafur (born 1971), author and activist who works with Malaria No More.
 Erika Amato (born 1969), actress, singer and founder of Velvet Chain.
 Peggy Bacon (1895–1987), painter, illustrator and writer.
 Emily Barton (born 1969), novelist.
 Maria Dizzia (born 1974, class of 1993), actress, 2010 Tony nominee for Best Performance by an Actress in a Play.
 Gina Genovese (born 1959), businesswoman and politician who has served as mayor of Long Hill Township.
 Alina Habba (born 1984, class of 2002), lawyer best known for representing former President of the United States, Donald Trump.
 Chisa Hutchinson (born 1980), playwright.
 Natalie Enright Jerger, computer scientist.
 Judy Joo (born 1974), professional chef, author, and television personality.
 Maureen Ogden (born 1928), politician who served seven terms in the New Jersey General Assembly, from 1982 to 1996.
 Shirley Paget, Marchioness of Anglesey (1924-2017), British public servant and writer.<ref>"The Dowager Marchioness of Anglesey Formidable head of the Women’s Institute who would later chair the Broadcasting Complaints Commission", 'The Times, January 31, 2017. Accessed October 25, 2019.</ref>
 Gabrielle Stanton (born 1968), television writer and producer best known for her work on the series Grey's Anatomy and Ugly Betty''.
 Janet Sorg Stoltzfus, (1931–2004), educator, who established the Ta'iz Cooperative School, the first non-religious school in north Yemen.
 Amanda Urban (born 1946/47), literary agent.

References

External links 
 

Early childhood education in the United States
Educational institutions established in 1894
1894 establishments in New Jersey
Girls' schools in New Jersey
New Jersey Association of Independent Schools
Private high schools in Union County, New Jersey
Summit, New Jersey
Private middle schools in New Jersey
Private elementary schools in New Jersey